Billings Senior High School, located in Billings, Montana, and part of the Billings Public Schools District, opened in 1940. Billings Senior High School is a comprehensive public institution.

Notable alumni
Stanley Anderson, actor
John Bohlinger Jr., American businessman and politician.
Julie Brown, American retired distance runner
Bud Luckey, noted animator for Pixar Animation 
Joe McIntosh, former Major League Baseball pitcher
Ray Metcalfe, politician and political activist in Alaska.
Nich Pertuit, American football placekicker
Jack Weyland, retired professor of physics at Brigham Young University–Idaho

References

External links 

Billings Public Schools district website

Schools in Yellowstone County, Montana
1940 establishments in Montana
Public high schools in Montana